"" is a song by German band Juli. It was written by band members Simon Triebel and Eva Briegel for their third studio album, In Love (2010).

Track listings
Standard edition
"Elektrisches Gefühl" – 3:43
"Elektrisches Gefühl" (Acoustic Version) – 3:15

Charts

References

2010 singles
Juli (band) songs
Universal Music Group singles
Songs written by Eva Briegel
Songs written by Simon Triebel
2010 songs
German-language songs